Jofre or Jofré may refer to the following people
Given name
Jofre de Foixà (died c. 1300), Catalan poet, musician and abbot
Jofré Llançol i Escrivà (c.1390–c.1436), Spanish noble
Jofre, Jofre Mateu González (born 1980), a Spanish football player

Surname
Éder Jofre (born 1936), Brazilian boxer
Joan Gilabert Jofré (1350–1417), Spanish priest
Juan Pablo Jofre (born 1983), Argentinian musician, composer and arranger
Oscar Jofre (born 1965), Canadian entrepreneur and technology specialist
Sara Del Carmen Jofre González (1935–2008), Cuban-American businesswoman

See also
Porto Jofre, a settlement in southern Brazil
Gioffre